Sabella is a genus of marine polychaete worm. Members of this genus are filter feeders and there are about ninety species. They live in tubes made of mud that project from the sand surface. They have a crown of feathery tentacles that protrude when the animal is submerged but are retracted when the animal is above water.

References

Sabellida